Parapontellidae is a family of copepods belonging to the order Calanoida.

Genera:
 Neopontella Scott, 1909
 Parapontella Brady, 1878

References

Copepods